The Progressive Party of the Philippines (PPP), also known as the Party for Philippine Progress, was a reformist political party that existed in the late 1950s and the 1960s. It is considered to be the earliest Filipino form of a genuine alternative party to the then-dominant political pair of the Nacionalista Party and the Liberal Party. The party ceased to exist by 1969.

History

1950s
The party was founded in 1957 by Manuel Manahan and Raul Manglapus, both of whom had served as key members of the administration of President Ramon Magsaysay before his untimely death earlier that year. The formation came as a result of the dissatisfaction of members of the Nacionalista Party over the "cold  treatment" given to them by allies of newly installed President Carlos P. Garcia.

In the 1957 general election held later that year, Manahan ran as the standard-bearer of the new party while Vicente Araneta served as his running mate. The party also fielded a complete slate of eight senatorial candidates, among them being Manglapus.

Manahan launched a campaign similar to that of the deceased but still popular Magsaysay, thus allowing him to become popular with the masses and pose a credible threat to President Garcia and Jose Yulo of the Liberal Party. In the end, Manahan only ranked third behind President Garcia, managing to acquire 20.90 percent of the vote. Araneta, on the other hand, lost to Diosdado Macapagal of the Liberal Party, garnering 7.97 percent of the vote. None of the senatorial candidates in the party won seats in the Senate.

In the 1959 midterm election, the party allied itself with defectors of the Liberal Party and the Nacionalista Party to form the Grand Alliance. During the campaign, the Grand Alliance highlighted the graft and corruption taking place under the Garcia administration. Eventually, the Alliance was successful in diminishing the Senate majority of the Nacionalista Party.

1960s
In 1961, the Progressive party, under the Grand Alliance, joined forces with the Liberal Party in order to prevent the re-election of President Garcia. Together, the united parties supported Vice-President Macapagal of the Liberal Party as its candidate for the 1961 presidential election and Emmanuel Pelaez of the Progressive Party as his running mate. Progressives Manglapus and Manahan also ran as guest senatorial candidates of the Liberal Party, with both of them managing to win seats in the Senate.

By 1965, members of the Grand Alliance separated themselves from the Liberal Party due to their dissatisfaction with the Macapagal administration for not fulfilling their expectations. Soon, the Progressive Party was renamed as the Party for Philippine Progress. It fielded Manglapus as its presidential candidate for the general election held later that year, and Manahan ran as its vice-presidential candidate. The rejuvenated party also fielded its own senatorial slate, though it was incomplete.

Widely known as the Third Force, the Party for Philippine Progress was seen as a genuine alternative to President Macapagal and Senator Ferdinand Marcos of the Nacionalista Party. Manglapus, in particular, showed surprising strength in the larger cities and the young voters. But unlike the 1957 election in which Manahan was seen as a viable contender, Manglapus was not seen as having a good chance of winning the election. In the end, Manglapus lost to Marcos with 5.17 percent of the vote, while Manahan lost to Fernando Lopez, the running mate of Marcos, with 3.40 percent of the vote.

The party continued to exist until it quietly disbanded in 1969.

Members

Candidates
The following were members of the Progressive Party who ran as candidates in the national elections. Those highlighted in bold signify those who were able to win the position they were running for.

Notes

Others
Richard Gordon
Blas Ople

Electoral performance

President

Vice president

Senate

House of Representatives

Legacy
Despite the decline of the party, it had considerable influence in current Philippine politics. For instance, the Lakas Kampi CMD, an active center-right political party in the country, considers the Progressive Party as its predecessor, largely because Manglapus was one of the earliest members of Lakas in the 1990s.

Elements of progressive political philosophy are also believed to have been passed on to later politicians no matter what part of the political spectrum they may belong to, such as former senator Raul Roco.

References

Defunct political parties in the Philippines
Political parties established in 1957
Political parties disestablished in 1969
1957 establishments in the Philippines
1960s disestablishments in the Philippines